is a Japanese anime director and artist.

Biography

Kōji Sawai was born on September 14, 1955, in Tokyo Japan. While attending Toyo University, Sawai had ambitions to become a manga artist and would later join Tatsunoko Productions as an artist and director, which would include working with Koichi Mashimo on The Irresponsible Captain Tylor, as well as other projects. After serving two years he left Tatsunoko to become a freelance director and has been working since.

Filmography

References

External links
 
 

1952 births
Living people
 
Anime directors
People from Tokyo
Japanese storyboard artists